is a Japanese voice actress and singer from Fukuoka Prefecture, affiliated with the talent agency m&i. As a singer, she is signed under record label Lantis. After passing an audition held by the talent agency Sigma Seven, she played her first main role as Kaname Asagiri in the video game Ōkami Kakushi in 2009.

She is known for her roles as Iona/I-401 in Arpeggio of Blue Steel, Alice Yotsuba/Cure Rosetta in DokiDoki! PreCure, Nagisa Shiota in Assassination Classroom, Miho Nishizumi in Girls und Panzer, and Karen Hojo in The Idolmaster Cinderella Girls. Apart from voice acting, she also performed theme song for anime such as Planet With and Ulysses: Jeanne d'Arc and the Alchemist Knight. In 2014, she received the Synergy Award at the 8th Seiyu Awards.

Biography
Fuchigami was inspired to become a voice actress after watching a DVD of Nana Mizuki which was recommended to her by a friend in high school. Although she originally aspired to be an actress or a lawyer, she later decided to be a voice actress. She graduated from the Yoyogi Animation vocational school in 2007. That same year, she passed an audition held by the talent agency Sigma Seven.

In 2009, she made her voice acting debut in the video game Ōkami Kakushi, voicing the character Kaname Asagiri. She would later reprise the role in the game's anime adaptation. That same year, she was given minor roles in various anime. In 2011, she left Sigma Seven and moved to the talent agency INCS toenter.

In 2012, she was cast as Miho Nishizumi in Girls und Panzer, a role which earned her many recognition. She, along with her co-stars, Ai Kayano, Mami Ozaki, Ikumi Nakagami, and Yuka Iguchi, performed the series' ending theme song "Enter Enter MISSION!". The following year, she was cast as Alice Yotsuba in the anime Dokidoki! PreCure. She then played the role of Petralka Anne Eldant III in the anime Outbreak Company which she also performed the ending theme song . That same year, she was cast as Iona/I-401 in Arpeggio of Blue Steel; she and the other cast members, Manami Numakura, and Hibiku Yamamura performed the series' ending theme songs  and "Innocent Blue".

In 2014 , she was cast as Karen Hojo in the mobile game The Idolmaster Cinderella Girls. She would later reprise the role in various other media, including the anime adaptation. In January of the same year, she played the character Nagisa Shiota in Assassination Classroom. That same year, she received the Synergy Award for her role in Girls und Panzer at 8th Seiyu Awards. Later that year, she was given the role of Sadayo Kawakami in the video game Persona 5; she also reprise her role in the game's anime adaptation. She then reprise her role as Miho Nishizumi in Girls und Panzer der Film; she also received the Rookie Award for the same role from 25th Japan Movie Critics Awards in 2016.

In 2018, she made her official debut as a singer for Lantis by releasing her first album Fly High Myway!; the album peaked at number 28 on the Oricon weekly charts. That same year, she was cast as Yomi Satsuki in Katana Maidens ~ Toji No Miko, Marie Mizuguchi in Caligula, and Sarasa Ryuō in Ongaku Shoujo. In August of the same year, she released her first single "Rainbow Planet"; the song was used as the ending theme song for the anime Planet With which she also played the character Harumi Kumashiro. The song peaked at number 56 on the Oricon weekly charts.

In 2019, she released her first mini album Journey & My Music; the album peaked at number 28 on the Oricon weekly charts.

Filmography

Anime

Films

Video games

Dubbing roles

Discography

Albums

Studio albums

Mini albums

Singles

References

External links
  
  
  
 Mai Fuchigami at Lantis 
 

Year of birth missing (living people)
Living people
Anime musicians
Japanese women pop singers
Japanese video game actresses
Japanese voice actresses
Lantis (company) artists
Musicians from Fukuoka Prefecture
Voice actresses from Fukuoka Prefecture
21st-century Japanese actresses
21st-century Japanese singers
21st-century Japanese women singers